"In My Dream (With Shiver)" is the second single by Japanese rock band Luna Sea, released on July 21, 1993. The song reached number 9 on the Oricon Singles Chart, and charted for four weeks.

This single version of "In My Dream (With Shiver)" is slightly different from the one on the album, Eden. Although it was not released until this single, the band had been performing "Slave" since 1990, the song has become a staple at Luna Sea concerts despite being a B-side. "Slave" is also the namesake of the band's official fan club, Slave, that was established in January 1992. "In My Dream (With Shiver)" was covered by the band LM.C for the Luna Sea Memorial Cover Album -Re:birth-.

Track listing
All songs written and composed by Luna Sea.

"In My Dream (With Shiver)" - 5:14Originally composed by J.
"Slave" - 3:34Originally composed by J.

References

1993 singles
Luna Sea songs
1993 songs